The 2022 Sierra Leone doctors strike was a strike action by medical doctors in Sierra Leone against low pay and lack of benefits. It began on 1 August and ended on 5 August when the government granted a pay rise and the issuance of weekly fuel allowances through a prepaid card. Part of a general cost of living crisis, protests occurred a week later which led to the death of 31 people, including 25 civilians.

Background
In 2018 and 2020, doctors in Sierra Leone went on strike for similar reasons. In May 2022, the government of Sierra Leone ended a monthly COVID-19 risk allowance and tax break for medical professionals. In July, doctors issued a 21-day strike notice.

References

2022 labor disputes and strikes
August 2022 events in Africa
2022 in Sierra Leone
Health in Sierra Leone
Labour disputes in Sierra Leone